Hélène-Gabrielle Fleury-Roy (21 June 1876 – 18 April 1957) was a French composer and the first woman to gain a prize at the prestigious Prix de Rome for composition.

Background
Fleury was born in Carlepont, Department Oise, France. She studied with Henri Dallier, Charles-Marie Widor, and André Gedalge at the Paris Conservatory. In the late 1890s, she lived in La Ferte-sous-Jouarre (Seine-et-Marne). She sent compositions to the Journal Musical Santa Cecilia Reims Composition Competition, and won in 1899 with Symphony Allegro for organ.

Fleury-Roy was the first woman admitted in 1903 to the Prix de Rome competition. On her first attempt at the prize, she failed the fugue test, but the next year she tried again and succeeded with the cantata Medora (libretto: Édouard Adenis) for two male and one female voice. She was awarded a third prize in the Grand Prix.

Hélène Fleury-Roy became a piano teacher after marrying her husband Louis Roy, a professor of mechanics at the university of Toulouse, in about 1906, and resided in Paris. In 1928, she became a professor at the Conservatory of Toulouse, teaching harmony, composition and piano. Her notable students at the conservatory included the conductor Louis Auriacombe (the future founder of the Toulouse Chamber Orchestra), composer Charles Chaynes, and violinist Pierre Dukan.

She died in Saint-Gaudens, Haute-Garonne aged 80.

Selected works
Fleury-Roy's works include songs, piano, violin, cello and organ pieces and a piano quartet.

 Arabesque for piano
 Bourree Gavotte for piano
 Canzonetta for piano
 Espérance piano
 Fleur des champs for piano
 La Nuit for piano
 Minuetto for piano
 Valse Caprice for piano
 Coeur virginal, song
 Mattutina, song
 Brise du soir for violin
 Trois pièces faciles for violin
 Fantaisie for viola (or violin) and piano, Op. 18
 Rêverie for cello
 Quatuor for piano and strings
 Pastorale for organ
 Grand Fantaise de concert

References

External links
 

1876 births
1957 deaths
19th-century classical composers
20th-century classical composers
Composers for pipe organ
French classical composers
French music educators
French women classical composers
Pupils of Charles-Marie Widor
Women music educators